Cheb Aziz born Bechiri Boudjema (1968 – 20 September 1996) was an Algerian musician and performer. Aziz was a very popular singer and performer across North Africa. He played Algerian musical genres such as Staifi and Chaoui.

Personal life
Aziz was married to the singer Selma. She gave birth to their daughter Manel in December 1994. He was the fourth singer to be found murdered, as music was declared blasphemous and banned in areas dominated by Islamic fundamentalists. Islamist militants had classified the Raï genre of music of consisting subjects relating to sex and drinking.

Death
On 20 September 1996, Aziz was killed by Islamist terrorists.

References

1968 births
1996 deaths
Assassinated Algerian people
People murdered in Algeria
People from Sétif
20th-century Algerian  male singers
Date of birth missing
Raï musicians